The  is a semi-annual manga award offered by the Japanese publisher Shueisha since 1971, under the auspices of its Weekly Shonen Jump magazine. It awarded new manga artists in the Story Manga category. Its counterpart award, Akatsuka Award, awards new manga artists in the Comedic Manga category. The award is named after the manga pioneer Osamu Tezuka and is designed to cultivate new artists. The prize for a top Selected Work is two million Japanese yen and for a lesser but still worthy work, a million yen. The award also has third place honorable mentions for contestants deemed worthy, that includes half a million yen. These cash prizes may not be awarded (as is often the case) if the judges deem none of the candidates worthy.

Historically the recipients have been in their early twenties, although two notable winners were over 90 years of age.

Selection committee

Committee chair
 Osamu Tezuka (1971-1988)
 Fujio Akatsuka (1989-2008). Due to his failing health, this title was merely a formality during the years leading up to his death on August 2, 2008, with his duties handled by Akira Toriyama in his absence.

Major committee members
These are the most prominent members of the committee only. Other adjudicators are also present in the committee.
 Akira Toriyama
 Eiichiro Oda
 Kazuki Takahashi
 Masanori Morita
 Masashi Kishimoto
 Hiroyuki Asada
 Takehiko Inoue
 Tezuka Productions

Recipients

Notable Recipients
 Yoshihiro Takahashi
 Buichi Terasawa　(1977, for Daichi yo Aoku Nare)
 Masakazu Katsura (1980, for Tsubasa and 1981, for Tenkousei wa Hensousei!?)
 Masanori Morita
 Takeshi Obata (1985, for 500 Kōnen no Shinwa)
 Yoshihiro Togashi (1986, for Buttobi Straight)
 Nobuhiro Watsuki (1987, for Teacher Pon)
 Takehiko Inoue (1988, for Kaede Purple) 
 Hiroyuki Takei
 Yuuziro Sakamoto (2003)

See also

 List of manga awards
 List of comics awards
Tezuka Osamu Cultural Prize
Akatsuka Award
List of awards named after people

References

1971 establishments in Japan
Manga awards
Awards established in 1971
Comics awards
Osamu Tezuka
Shueisha